In geometry, the bicorn, also known as a cocked hat curve due to its resemblance to a bicorne, is a rational quartic curve defined by the equation

It has two cusps and is symmetric about the y-axis.

History
In 1864, James Joseph Sylvester studied the curve

in connection with the classification of quintic equations; he named the curve a bicorn because it has two cusps. This curve was further studied by Arthur Cayley in 1867.

Properties

The bicorn is a plane algebraic curve of degree four and genus zero. It has two cusp singularities in the real plane, and a double point in the complex projective plane at x=0, z=0. If we move x=0 and z=0 to the origin substituting and perform an imaginary rotation on x bu substituting ix/z for x and 1/z for y in the bicorn curve, we obtain

See also
 List of curves

References

External links
 

Plane curves
Algebraic curves